Bernardinai.lt is a Lithuanian online newspaper. It was launched on February 21, 2004 and is run by Vilnius Franciscan community. It was founded as an alternative to major Lithuanian media, with a goal to provide objective information. The motto of the newspaper is a Confucius quote: "Instead of cursing the darkness, light a candle!"

Editorial staff and authors 

Current editor in chief of the website is Andrius Navickas; culture, family and education sector is edited by Elvyra Kučinskaitė; politics, economics and civics society - Loreta Povilionienė, language editor is Michailina Bočiarova and technical editor - Povilas Zaleskis

The newspaper has published writings by many renowned Lithuanian journalists and social activists: Rimvydas Paleckis, Ginas Dabašinskas, Dalius Stancikas, Vladimiras Laučius, Tomas Viluckas, Valdas Kilpys, Aušra Maslauskaitė, Doloresa Kazragytė, Giedrius Kuprevičius, Egdūnas Račius, Laima Arnatkevičiūtė, Gintautas Vaitoška, Leonidas Donskis, Virgis Valentinavičius, Arūnas Poviliūnas, Indrė Makaraitytė, Rytis Juozapavičius, Vytautas Radžvilas and others.

References 

Lithuanian news websites
2004 establishments in Lithuania